James Diamond may refer to:

Jim Diamond (singer) (1951–2015), Scottish songwriter and singer
Jim Diamond (1988 album)
Jim Diamond (1993 album)
Jim Diamond (music producer) (born 1965), studio engineer
James H. Diamond (1925–1945), US Army soldier and Medal of Honor recipient
James Diamond, a character in Big Time Rush, played by James Maslow
James Diamond (cinematographer) (1894–1936), American cinematographer